Anthology is the 13th album by Ensemble Renaissance, released in 1997 on the Al Segno label in Germany.
The double disc is the greatest hits compilation of the Medieval and Renaissance music; the material on this Anthology are remasters from Ensemble's LPs Greatest Hits 3, Mon amy, Hommage a l'amour.

The first disc Hommage a l'amour is a collection of the European Medieval music, beginning with goliard tunes from the codices Carmina Burana and Cambridge Songs, trouvere and minnesanger songs, Spanish monophonic songs from the Cantigas de Santa Maria and polyphonic songs from the Llibre Vermell de Montserrat, traveler's dances from the Balkan, England, France, and especially Italian Trecento dances from the famous London manuscript 29987.
The second disc Mon amy is dedicated to the friendly atmosphere of the Renaissance music with works from the Cancionero de Palacio, dance collections by Tielman Susato, Claude Gervaise, Michael Praetorius, Italian renaissance madrigals and tunes, and also music of the Elizabethan epoch and Shakespeare's theatre, including John Dowland.

Track listing
All tracks produced by Ensemble Renaissance.

Personnel
The following people contributed to the Anthology

Dragana Jugović del Monaco – mezzo-soprano
Vojka Đorđević – soprano
Ljudmila Gross – soprano
Miroslav Marković – baritone
Dragan Mlađenović – tenor, crumhorns, sopranino recorder, rauschpfeife, jew's harp, bağlama
Georges Grujić – recorders, sopranino rauschpfeife, bass crumhorn, soprano/bass cornamuse, tenor rackett
Dragan Karolić – recorders, tenor/bass cornamuse
Marko Štegelman – bagpipes
Miomir Ristić – fiddle, rebec, percussion instruments
Vladimir Ćirić – vielle, baroque violin, rebec, oud, psaltery, bağlama, percussion instruments
Zoran Kostadinović – rebec
Svetislav Madžarević – lute, vihuela, percussion instruments
Slobodan Vujisić – šargija, renaissance lute, oud
Zoran Kočišević – double bass
Boris Bunjac – percussion instruments
Jovan Horvat – percussions

References

External links
album on allmusic

1997 albums
Ensemble Renaissance albums